Huxiajie, meaning Huxia Street, is a station on Line 5 of Chongqing Rail Transit in Chongqing municipality, China. It is located in Yubei District and opened in 2017.

Station structure
There are two island platforms at this station, but only two inner ones are currently in use, while the other two outer ones are reserved.

References

Railway stations in Chongqing
Railway stations in China opened in 2017
Chongqing Rail Transit stations